Fosterville is an unincorporated community in Rutherford County, Tennessee, United States. Its ZIP code is 37063.

A post office called Fosterville has been in operation since 1837. Besides the post office, Fosterville contained a country store.

Notes

Unincorporated communities in Rutherford County, Tennessee
Unincorporated communities in Tennessee